Kyokugōzan Kazuyasu (born 18 September 1968 as Taizan Kimura) is a former sumo wrestler from Ichikawa, Chiba, Japan. He made his professional debut in March 1984, and reached the top division in November 1989. His highest rank was maegashira 9. He left the sumo world upon retirement in September 1996.

Career record

See also
Glossary of sumo terms
List of past sumo wrestlers
List of sumo tournament second division champions

References

1968 births
Living people
Japanese sumo wrestlers
Sumo people from Chiba Prefecture